The 1985 America East men's basketball tournament was hosted by the higher seeds in head-to-head matchups. The final was held at Matthews Arena on the campus of the Northeastern University. Northeastern gained its second consecutive and fourth overall America East Conference Championship and an automatic berth to the NCAA tournament with its win over Boston University. Northeastern was given the 14th seed in the East Regional of the NCAA Tournament and lost in the first round to Illinois 76–57. Canisius College gained a bid to the NIT and lost in the first round to Nebraska 79–66.

Bracket and Results

See also
America East Conference

References

America East Conference men's basketball tournament
1984–85 ECAC North men's basketball season